Lupton's bird-of-paradise is a bird in the family Paradisaeidae that is a hybrid between a greater bird-of-paradise and raggiana bird-of-paradise.  It was described by Percy Lowe in 1923 as a subspecies of the greater bird-of-paradise, though he also noted the possibility of hybridisation.

History
This hybrid is known from many adult male specimens taken from the Fly River region of southern New Guinea.

Notes

References
 
 

Paradisaea
Hybrid birds of paradise
Birds of New Guinea